Bruce Anderson (born 23 September 1998) is a Scottish professional footballer who plays as a forward for Scottish Premiership club Livingston. He previously played for Aberdeen, where he came through the ranks from the age of 11.

Career

Aberdeen
Anderson began his footballing career with Dyce Boys Club when he was five, before signing with Aberdeen youth teams when he was 13. His first experience of senior football came when he moved out on loan to Scottish League Two side Elgin City at the beginning of the 2017–18 season. In five months with the club, Anderson scored six times in fourteen appearances, before returning to his parent club in January 2018.

He made his Aberdeen debut as a substitute against Rangers on 5 August 2018, scoring an equalising goal in stoppage time to secure a 1–1 draw. On 4 September 2018, Anderson signed a new deal until summer 2021. He joined Scottish Championship side Dunfermline Athletic on loan in January 2019.

Anderson was one of eight Aberdeen players who received a suspended three-match ban from the Scottish FA after they breached coronavirus-related restrictions due to visiting a bar in August 2020. On 5 October 2020, Anderson signed for Ayr United, on a season-long loan. However he was recalled by Aberdeen in January. He made 12 appearances scoring two goals against Albion Rovers in the League Cup. On 1 February 2021, Anderson joined fellow Premiership side Hamilton Academical on loan until the end of the season. He scored his first goal for Hamilton in a 4–1 win against Motherwell on 13 February 2021.

Livingston
Anderson signed a three-year contract with Livingston in May 2021, which due to take effect when his contract with Aberdeen expires. He moved in the opposite direction of fellow striker Jay Emmanuel-Thomas, who signed a two-year contract with Aberdeen on the same day.

Career statistics

References

External links

1998 births
Living people
People from Banff, Aberdeenshire
Footballers from Aberdeenshire
Scottish footballers
Association football forwards
Elgin City F.C. players
Aberdeen F.C. players
Dunfermline Athletic F.C. players
Ayr United F.C. players
Hamilton Academical F.C. players
Scottish Professional Football League players
Livingston F.C. players